Ray Island, also known as the Ray, is a  nature reserve west of Mersea Island in Essex. It is owned by the National Trust, who bought it in 1970. It was leased by the National Trust to the Essex Wildlife Trust managed the site. Following the cessation of the lease associated with the associated with the island the National Trust has resumed responsibility for its management.

Wildlife
The site is a sandy hill which rises out of an area of saltmarsh. It has rough grassland and a shingle foreshore. There are saltmarsh plants such as lax flowered sea-lavender, sea rush and golden samphire, and breeding birds include oystercatchers and shelducks.

Environmental designations 
The site has been designated as Site of Special Scientific Interest (SSSI), Marine Conservation Zones (MCZ), Ramsar Site, Special Area of Conservation (SAC) and a Special Protection Area (SPA).

Literature

Mehalah 
Ray Island was the setting for the novel Mehalah: A Story of the Salt Marshes by Sabine Baring-Gould, who was the rector of East Mersea. Baring-Gould describes it thus in the first chapter:

A more desolate region can scarce be conceived, and yet it is not without beauty. In summer, the thrift mantles the marches with shot satin, passing through all gradations of tint from maiden's blush to lily white. Thereafter a purple glow steals over the waste, as the sea lavender bursts into flower, and simultaneously every creek and pool is royally fringed with sea aster. A little later the glasswort, that shot up green and transparent as emerald glass in the early spring, turns to every tinge of carmine.

The Essex Serpent 
The marshy landscape also formed part of the inspiration for The Essex Serpent, by Sarah Perry.

Folklore 
A bear is said to have escaped from a ship onto the island and killed a group of fisherman who had landed there.

There is also the tale is of a drunkard who chased his wife and daughter into the marshes, however he was drowned by the rising tide. It has been claimed his shouts can be heard along with the panting of the mother and the baby's crying.

It is also claimed there is the ghost of a Roman centurion and the sound of a horses hooves can be heard.

Access
General public access is by boat via the Ray Channel from Mersea. There is also an old pathway from The Strood that winds through the maze of salt marshes called the Bonner's Saltings for over a kilometre to reach the island including single-plank bridges without handrails. Footpath access for Trust members, from 1 March to 31 August. General public access using your own boat. It is important to check the state and times of the tide as the pathway floods. Camping is banned by the trust.

References

Essex Wildlife Trust
Islands of Essex
Uninhabited islands of England
National Trust properties in Essex